Irina Antonova (formerly Baranovskaya; born 2 February 1986) is a Kazakhstani-Russian handball player for Zvezda Zvenigorod and the Kazakhstani national team.

She participated at the 2011 World Women's Handball Championship in Brazil.

References

External links

1986 births
Living people
Sportspeople from Moscow
Russian female handball players
Kazakhstani female handball players
Kazakhstani people of Russian descent